Heptaloba argyriodactylus is a moth of the family Pterophoridae. It was described by Francis Walker in 1864, and it is found in Sri Lanka.

External links
The Entomologist's Monthly Magazine

Moths described in 1864
Deuterocopinae
Taxa named by Francis Walker (entomologist)